Kuran-e Torkiyeh (also Romanized as Kūrān-e Torkīyeh and Kūrān Torkīyeh; also known as Kūrān) is a village in Hesar Rural District, Khabushan District, Faruj County, North Khorasan Province, Iran. At the 2006 census, its population was 643, in 175 families.

References 

Populated places in Faruj County